Damé is a town in eastern Ivory Coast. It is a sub-prefecture of Agnibilékrou Department in Indénié-Djuablin Region, Comoé District. Seven kilometres east of the town is a border crossing with Ghana.

Damé was a commune until March 2012, when it became one of 1126 communes nationwide that were abolished.
In 2014, the population of the sub-prefecture of Damé was 15,920 .

Villages
The nine villages of the sub-prefecture of Damé and their population in 2014 are :
 Damé  (9 676) 
 Adamakro  (419)
 Amangobo  (284)
 Brahimankro  (1 377)
 Fraakro  (368)
 Kotokosso  (1 866)
 Massakro  (1 350)
 Morekro  (351)
 Sirikikro  (229)

References

Sub-prefectures of Indénié-Djuablin
Former communes of Ivory Coast